William Robert Purcell (born February 12, 1931 in Laurinburg, North Carolina) is a Democratic politician. He was a member of the North Carolina General Assembly representing the state's twenty-fifth Senate district, including constituents in Anson, Richmond, Scotland and Stanly counties 1997–2013. Purcell served as a captain in the U.S. army medical corp in France from 1957 to 1959. Purcell then graduated from Davidson College and the University of North Carolina School of Medicine and was a pediatrician. Purcell served on the Laurinburg, North Carolina city council and was mayor.

References

1931 births
Living people
People from Laurinburg, North Carolina
Davidson College alumni
University of North Carolina School of Medicine alumni
Physicians from North Carolina
North Carolina city council members
Mayors of places in North Carolina
Democratic Party North Carolina state senators
21st-century American politicians
People from Monroe, North Carolina